The Manitoba Liquor Control Commission (MLCC) was a Crown corporation mandated with regulating, distributing, and selling beverage alcohol in the Canadian province of Manitoba. In 2014, the Manitoba government merged MLCC with the Manitoba Lotteries Corporation to form the Manitoba Liquor & Lotteries Corporation.

History

Board of Liquor Control Commissioners 
What came to be the MLCC was preceded by the three-member Board of Liquor Control Commissioners—established in 1889 under the Liquor License Act, which banned the sale, distribution, or transportation of liquor without a liquor license. Reporting directly to the Attorney General, the Board was in charge of issuing, denying, suspending, and revoking all liquor licenses within Manitoba, as well monitoring compliance with the Liquor License Act. The Board would lose much of its function in 1916 with the passing of the Manitoba Temperance Act, which banned most liquor sales within the province.

Liquor Control Commission 
In 1923, the Manitoba Temperance Act was repealed by the Government Liquor Control Act, which permitted the sale of beverage liquor to the general public through government-owned and -operated stores, as well as through licensed vendors. For this, the Act dissolved the Board of Liquor Control Commissioners and formed in its place the Government Liquor Control Commission to act as the sole authority for the sale and distribution of liquor in Manitoba. The new Commission was composed of three Lieutenant-Governor-appointed members and was mandated with implementing and overseeing the provisions of the Government Liquor Control Act (1923, 1928), including the operation of liquor stores, as well as the regulation of liquor sales and use within Manitoba.

In 1957, as part of the new Liquor Control Act (1956), the Government Liquor Control Commission became known as the Liquor Control Commission of Manitoba. The Liquor Control Act modernized liquor sales and regulation; however, the Commission retained its function of controlling Manitoba liquor sales, and reported to the Minister responsible for the Liquor Control Act. The Liquor Control Act empowered the commission to buy, import, and sell liquor; control the possession, sale, and transportation of liquor; and to establish and operate liquor retailers throughout the province of Manitoba.

Beginning in the late 1970s and early 1980s, the commission's role was broadened to include greater emphasis on corporate effectiveness, product quality control, customer relations, workplace quality, and social responsibility. This brought on public campaigns for responsible alcohol consumption, and the implementation of employee development programs, among other things.

In 1980, the commission was renamed the Manitoba Liquor Control Commission.

Merger (2012–14)
In April 2012, the Government of Manitoba announced, through the provincial budget, a plan to merge the Manitoba Liquor Control Commission with Manitoba Lotteries, to form the Manitoba Liquor & Lotteries Corporation. In September 2012, the province held public consultations in six communities to discuss the merger: Arborg, Thompson, The Pas, Brandon, Winkler, and Winnipeg.

The Manitoba Liquor and Lotteries Corporation Act and the Manitoba Liquor and Gaming Control Act came into effect on 1 April 2014, officially beginning the operation of Manitoba Liquor & Lotteries Corporation. At the same time, the Liquor and Gaming Authority of Manitoba was created to absorb the regulatory functions of the two former corporations.

Activities
MLCC was headquartered in Winnipeg. At the time of its merger, MLCC employed approximately 1,200 full and part-time workers, all being members of the Manitoba Government Employees Union.

In October 2008, MLCC was named one of "Canada's Top 100 Employers" by Mediacorp Canada Inc., and was featured in Maclean's newsmagazine. Later that month, MLCC was also named one of Manitoba's Top Employers, which was announced by the Winnipeg Free Press newspaper.

At the time of its merger, MLCC had 56 Liquor Mart/Liquor Mart Express locations, 175 Liquor Vendors (partners with the MLCC), and 8 specialty wine stores throughout Manitoba, and its products included a total of 4,341 active product listings as of 2012.

The MLCC's enforcement of liquor controls included inspections of licensed premises, sale permit functions as well as professional shoppers in liquor marts to ensure proof-of-age challenges.

Minister responsible for The Liquor Control Act 
The Minister charged with the administration of The Liquor Control Act was a government position in Manitoba responsible for the implementation and maintenance of the former Liquor Control Act, including the responsibility to oversee the Manitoba Liquor Control Commission and the Manitoba Liquor & Lotteries Corporation Rather than a full portfolio, it was always held by ministers with other cabinet responsibilities.

References

Canadian provincial alcohol departments and agencies
Alcohol in Manitoba
Defunct companies of Manitoba
Alcohol distribution retailers of Canada
Government agencies established in 1923
1923 establishments in Manitoba
Companies disestablished in 2013
Former crown corporations of Manitoba
Defunct companies based in Winnipeg